Ugly Creek may refer to:

Ugly Creek (Georgia)
Ugly Creek (Tennessee)
Big Ugly Creek, a stream in West Virginia